Rembarrnga (Rembarunga) is an Australian Aboriginal language. It is one of the Northern Non-Pama–Nyungan languages, spoken in the Roper River region of the Northern territory. There are three dialects of Rembarrnga, namely Galduyh, Gikkik and Mappurn. It is a highly endangered language, with very few remaining fluent speakers. It is very likely that the language is no longer being learned by children. Instead, the children of Rembarrnga speakers are now learning neighbouring languages such as Kriol in south central Arnhem Land, and Kunwinjku, a dialect of Bininj Kunwok, in north central Arnhem Land.

Fluent speakers of Rembarrnga currently (2015) live in the remote towns of Maningrida and Ramingining, and in nearby outstations such as Borlkdjam, Buluhkaduru and Malnyangarnak. Some other communities associated with Rembarrnga are Ankebarrbirri, Barunga, Beswick and Bulman. Neighbouring languages include Dalabon, Burarra, Ngalakan, Ngandi and the Bininj Kunwok dialects Kunwinjku and Kune.

Linguists who have worked with Rembarrnga speakers to produce language materials include Graham McKay, Carolyn Coleman and Adam Saulwick. Principal works on Rembarrnga include a grammar, a dictionary and a learner's guide.

References

Gunwinyguan languages